The Mr. Show-Me Basketball honor recognizes the top male high school basketball player in the state of Missouri. The name of the award differs from other Mr. Basketball awards to reflect Missouri's state nickname, the Show-Me State. The award is presented annually by the Missouri Basketball Coaches Association. In order to be considered for the award, nominees must have been nominated by their high school coach, started in 90 percent of all games, must be high school seniors, and must be of "outstanding moral character". Ten boys are selected as finalists after nominations are compiled, and a special committee of assistant college coaches in Missouri choose the winner.

The first recipient of the honor was Monroe Douglas in 1985, who is the fourth all-time leading scorer for the Saint Louis Billikens men's basketball team in total points with 1,877 points and was named to their all-century team. Two sets of brothers, JarRon and Kareem Rush along with Tyler and Ben Hansbrough, have received the honor. Nine recipients of the Mr. Show-Me Basketball honor have been drafted into the NBA, the highest draft picks being both Bradley Beal in the 2012 NBA draft and Jayson Tatum in the 2017 NBA draft with the 3rd overall pick. Other recipients of the honor have played with professional teams in Europe and Asia including Michael Dixon, who played for the Georgia national basketball team in the EuroBasket 2017 qualification tournament. Many recipients have also pursued coaching opportunities in high schools and colleges.

Winners

Schools with multiple winners

See also
Miss Show-Me Basketball
Mr. Basketball USA

References

Missouri
High school sports in Missouri
Awards established in 1985
1985 establishments in Missouri
Lists of people from Missouri
Show-Me Basketball